The Convention on the Service Abroad of Judicial and Extrajudicial Documents in Civil or Commercial Matters, more commonly called the Hague Service Convention, is a multilateral treaty that was adopted in The Hague, The Netherlands, on 15 November 1965 by member states of the Hague Conference on Private International Law. It came into existence to give litigants a reliable and efficient means of serving the documents on parties living, operating or based in another country. The provisions of the convention apply to service of process in civil and commercial matters but not criminal matters. Also, Article 1 states that the Convention shall not apply if the address of the person to be served with the document is not known.

Diplomatic service via letters rogatory 

For states that are not party to the Hague Service Convention, diplomatic channels are generally used for the service of legal documents. It is generally effected by a letter rogatory, which is a formal request to issue a judicial order from a court in the state where proceedings are underway to a court in another state. This procedure generally requires transmission of the document to be served from the originating court to the foreign ministry in the state of origin. The foreign ministry in the state of origin forwards the request to the foreign ministry in the destination state. The foreign ministry then forwards the documents to the local court. The local court then makes an order to allow for the service. Once service is made, a certificate of service would then pass through the same channels in reverse. Under a somewhat more streamlined procedure, courts can sometimes forward service requests to the foreign ministry or the foreign court directly, cutting out one or more steps in the process.

Procedure 
The Hague Service Convention established a more simplified means for parties to effect service in other contracting states. Under the convention, each contracting state is required to designate a central authority to accept incoming requests for service. A judicial officer who is competent to serve process in the state of origin is permitted to send request for service directly to the central authority of the state where service is to be made. Upon receiving the request, the central authority in the receiving state arranges for service in a manner permitted within the receiving state, typically through a local court. Once service is effected, the central authority sends a certificate of service to the judicial officer who made the request. Parties are required to use three standardized forms: a request for service, a summary of the proceedings (similar to a summons), and a certificate of service.

The main benefits of the Hague Service Convention over letters rogatory is that it is faster (requests generally take two to four months rather than six months to one year), it uses standardized forms that should be recognized by authorities in other states, and it is cheaper (in most cases) because service can be effected by a local attorney without hiring a foreign attorney to advise on foreign service procedures.

The Hague Service Convention does not prohibit a receiving state from permitting international service by methods otherwise authorized by domestic law. For example, a state could allow for service directly by mail or by personal service. States that permit parties to use these alternative means of service make a separate designation in the documents they file upon ratifying or acceding to the Convention.

Alternate methods of service 
The Hague Convention provides various modes of process service of documents such as by postal channel or by diplomatic/consular agents, judicial officers, officials or other competent persons. These provisions are covered under Articles 8 to 10 and may or not be allowed by member countries as a valid mode of serving the documents in their territory. The method of serving the documents through a central agency (Article 5) is not optional but is binding on all the member countries. Service through a central agency usually takes a long time: 4 to 12 months. The convention gives relief to the litigants if they have not received certificate of service or delivery from the central agency even after waiting for six months. In such cases, the court may, if it considers that a reasonable time has elapsed, give its judgment. Also, in case of urgency, the court may issue a provisional order or protective measure even before six-month waiting period.

Central authority 
Although the service is free, it may take 4 to 12 months for the central authority to process. The central authority decides which method is to be used. In many cases, a bailiff will be assigned by a local court to serve the documents and mail back the proof of service, but service by mail is also possible.

Service by mail 
Service by mail is possible only in states that have not objected to that method under Article 10(a) of the convention and if the jurisdiction where the court case takes place allows it under its applicable law. It is therefore possible in France and the Netherlands but not in Germany, Switzerland, and South Korea, where incoming service is to be effected exclusively through the state's central authority.

In the United States, the interpretation of a provision in Article 10(a) has long been controversial, as the judiciary in some of its jurisdictions contended that service by mail was impossible because the word "send" rather than "serve" was used in the English-language version of the convention. The matter was finally resolved in May 2017 by the US Supreme Court in Water Splash, Inc. v. Menon, bringing the interpretation in line with parties in other US jurisdictions and the rest of the world.

Relation with other instruments 
Under the convention, states may conclude different agreements between them that take precedence over the convention. Thus, in the European Union (except for Denmark) other rules are applied instead of the Convention.

State parties
, 79 states are contracting parties of the Hague Service Convention. They include 66 of the 88 Hague Conference on Private International Law member states in addition to 13 other states.

Notes

References

External links
Full text of the Convention
List of central authorities designated by states parties

1965 in the Netherlands
Civil procedure
Judicial cooperation
Hague Conference on Private International Law conventions
Treaties concluded in 1965
Treaties entered into force in 1969
Treaties of Albania
Treaties of Andorra
Treaties of Antigua and Barbuda
Treaties of Argentina
Treaties of Armenia
Treaties of Australia
Treaties of the Bahamas
Treaties of Barbados
Treaties of Belarus
Treaties of Belgium
Treaties of Bosnia and Herzegovina
Treaties of Belize
Treaties of Botswana
Treaties of Brazil
Treaties of Bulgaria
Treaties of Canada
Treaties of the People's Republic of China
Treaties of Colombia
Treaties of Costa Rica
Treaties of Croatia
Treaties of Cyprus
Treaties of the Czech Republic
Treaties of Czechoslovakia
Treaties of Denmark
Treaties of Egypt
Treaties of Estonia
Treaties of Finland
Treaties of France
Treaties of West Germany
Treaties of Greece
Treaties of Hungary
Treaties of Iceland
Treaties of India
Treaties of Ireland
Treaties of Israel
Treaties of Italy
Treaties of Japan
Treaties of Kazakhstan
Treaties of South Korea
Treaties of Kuwait
Treaties of Latvia
Treaties of Lithuania
Treaties of Luxembourg
Treaties of North Macedonia
Treaties of Malawi
Treaties of Malta
Treaties of Moldova
Treaties of Montenegro
Treaties of Monaco
Treaties of Mexico
Treaties of Morocco
Treaties of the Netherlands
Treaties of Norway
Treaties of Pakistan
Treaties of Poland
Treaties of Portugal
Treaties of Romania
Treaties of Russia
Treaties of Saint Vincent and the Grenadines
Treaties of San Marino
Treaties of Serbia
Treaties of Seychelles
Treaties of Slovakia
Treaties of Slovenia
Treaties of Spain
Treaties of Sri Lanka
Treaties of Sweden
Treaties of Switzerland
Treaties of Tunisia
Treaties of Turkey
Treaties of Ukraine
Treaties of the United Kingdom
Treaties of the United States
Treaties of Venezuela
Treaties of Vietnam
Treaties extended to Ashmore and Cartier Islands
Treaties extended to the Australian Antarctic Territory
Treaties extended to Christmas Island
Treaties extended to the Cocos (Keeling) Islands
Treaties extended to Heard Island and McDonald Islands
Treaties extended to Norfolk Island
Treaties extended to the Coral Sea Islands
Treaties extended to Aruba
Treaties extended to Saint Christopher-Nevis-Anguilla
Treaties extended to Bermuda
Treaties extended to the British Virgin Islands
Treaties extended to the Cayman Islands
Treaties extended to the Falkland Islands
Treaties extended to Gibraltar
Treaties extended to Guernsey
Treaties extended to the Isle of Man
Treaties extended to Jersey
Treaties extended to Montserrat
Treaties extended to the Pitcairn Islands
Treaties extended to the Turks and Caicos Islands
Treaties extended to Saint Helena, Ascension and Tristan da Cunha
Treaties extended to Guam
Treaties extended to Puerto Rico
Treaties extended to the United States Virgin Islands
Treaties extended to the Trust Territory of the Pacific Islands
Treaties extended to British Antigua and Barbuda
Treaties extended to British Honduras
Treaties extended to the British Solomon Islands
Treaties extended to the Gilbert and Ellice Islands
Treaties extended to British Saint Lucia
Treaties extended to British Saint Vincent and the Grenadines
Treaties extended to the Crown Colony of Seychelles
Treaties extended to the French Southern and Antarctic Lands
Treaties extended to French Polynesia
Treaties extended to French Guiana
Treaties extended to Clipperton Island
Treaties extended to the New Hebrides
Treaties extended to Guadeloupe
Treaties extended to Martinique
Treaties extended to Mayotte
Treaties extended to Réunion
Treaties extended to New Caledonia
Treaties extended to Wallis and Futuna
Treaties extended to French Somaliland
Treaties extended to French Comoros
Treaties extended to Saint Pierre and Miquelon
Treaties extended to British Hong Kong
Treaties extended to Portuguese Macau
20th century in The Hague
Treaties extended to the Northern Mariana Islands